Melodía Ruiz Gutiérrez (born October 12, 1990), best known by her stage name Melody, is a Spanish singer. Melody became famous at the age of 10 with her song "El baile del gorila", one of the biggest summer hits of 2001 in Spain. She has released six albums and numerous singles.

Early life 
Melodía Ruiz Gutiérrez was born on October 12, 1990, in Dos Hermanas, a city near Seville, Andalusia. Her family has strong ties to music; her father and some other family members played in a Sevilla fiesta band called Los Quillos or Los Kiyos, a Jackson 5-like group of child singers.

Melody learned to sing before she could talk. At six, she declared (to her mother) that she was born to sing and dance. Her mother tried to discourage her, saying music was a difficult profession, but she persisted.

Career

2001: De pata negra 
Melody was discovered by rumba flamenca veteran and producer El Fary after her father sent him a demo tape of her singing. El Fary was impressed and asked her to come to Madrid to record an album. In 2001, at the age of 10, Melody released her debut album De pata negra. The album was produced by Gustavo Ramudo at El Fary's Carabirubí Producciones and released through Epic Spain (Sony Music Entertainment Spain).

The lead single "El baile del gorila" (The Gorilla Dance), which was written and composed by José Antonio Benítez Serrano, became a big summer hit in Spain. It reached number one in Spain for the week of July 21. Melody became a child prodigy of Spanish music.

The song "De pata negra" was released as the second single from her debut album; it debuted at number 18 in Spain for the week of September 15, 2001 and peaked at number 12 three weeks later.

Melody's debut album sold between 500,000 units and 600,000 copies. By October 2001, it had been certified double platinum in Spain for selling 200,000 copies. On October 30, it was released in the United States and in Latin America. In May 2002, it was certified gold in the US by the Recording Industry Association of America. The same year, it received a Latin Grammy nomination for Best Children's Album.

2002: Muévete 
On June 10, 2002, Melody released her second album, Muévete, also produced by Gustavo Ramudo. The title track "Muévete" debuted at number 11 in Spain for the week of June 2, 2002, peaking at number 7 one week later. The album sold 50,000 copies.

2003: T.Q.M. 
In early 2003, Melody's first album De pata negra was a finalist for the Billboard Latin Music Award in the category "Latin Pop Album of the Year, New Artist". Her third album T.Q.M. was released on June 23, 2003. It was produced by Luis Gomez Escolar and Julio Seijas. The first single was "Será". The song "Dabadabadá" was featured on the Spanish soundtrack for the Brazilian soap opera Mulheres Apaixonadas (titled Mujeres apasionadas in Spain). The soundtrack album, which also includes tracks by Jon Secada, Gloria Estefan, Huey Dunbar, and other well-known Spanish-language artists, went on sale on March 23, 2004. "Dabadabadá" was released as a single and debuted at number 9 in Spain for the week of September 14, 2003. Melody's third album sold 30,000 copies.

In November 2003, Melody appeared on the Disney DVD Ellas & magia, a compilation of Disney princesses songs performed in Spanish by famous artists including Pastora Soler, Marta Sánchez, and Bellepop. Melody sang Meg's song (Spanish title: "No diré que es amor") from the animated film Hercules. Profits from the DVD went to the Fundación de Ayuda contra la Drogadicción.

2004: Melodía 
On October 18, 2004, Melody released her fourth album Melodía, which saw her move towards a teenage audience. The album was produced by Danilo Ballo and a team led by Emanuele Ruffinengo. The first single was "Y ese niño", which was composed by Lucas González Gómez from the duo Andy y Lucas. The album debuted at number 15 in Spain for the week of October 30, 2004.

That year, Melody also released a duet with Greek tenor Mario Frangoulis. The song, titled "Cu'mme", was part of Frangoulis' second international album Follow Your Heart, which was released on November 9, 2004, on Sony Classical.

2005–2008: Urban legend 
By 2005 Melody had disappeared from the media and waited three years to release another record, dedicating that time to her personal development. Due to her complete disappearance from the media, a rumour that she had died began circulating. An urban legend claimed she was killed in an airplane accident. Another version of her death myth, presented by a blog titled Los Corotos, alleged she committed suicide while suffering from depression, but it turns out it was another person named Melody (not Melodía, which is the singer's real name) who died. Melody dismissed the rumours when she released her fifth album Los buenos días in 2008.

2008: Los buenos días 
Los buenos días was produced by Queco and was mastered in New York. Melody was 17 at the time of the album's release, and the album was marketed as her "first disc of maturity". Melody co-wrote some of the tracks. The first single was  "Te digo adiós", a modern rumba flamenca song. In it, Melody appeared to become a woman.

2009: Eurovision Song Contest 2009 preliminaries 

At the end of 2008, Melody collaborated with Los Vivancos, a flamenco dance group, on a song titled "Amante de la luna", which was written by Manolo Carrasco and Fernando Bermúdez.

Melody and Los Vivancos entered the Spanish national pre-selection for the 2009 Eurovision Song Contest, held in Moscow. The selection process was organized by RTVE and started with an online vote on the TVE website, which Melody and Los Vivancos won with 208,481 votes and advanced directly to the semifinals.

On February 14, 2009, they performed in the first of three semifinals and, having received the maximum support from the jury (12 points) and the highest score from the viewers (12 points), finished first and advanced directly to the final. In the final, held on February 28, 2009, Melody, this time on her own after Los Vivancos' withdrawal, received the same number of points (22) as Soraya with her song "La noche es para mí", but it was Soraya who was declared the winner because she scored higher in the televote.

2012: "Ten cuidaíto conmigo" 
In 2012 Melody gave a preview of her sixth studio album, releasing a single titled "Ten cuidaíto conmigo". The official presentation of the song was held in Málaga in February. The album's title was announced as Mucho camino por andar. Preparing to promote the album, that spring she changed her management office to Serendipity Producciones, S.L.

2013–2014: Tu cara me suena 
On February 25, 2013, Melody appeared on the Spanish television channel Antena 3 in the first edition of Tu cara me suena ("Your Face Sounds Familiar"), a show in which celebrities impersonate famous singers. Melody impersonated Natalia Jiménez and advanced to the final along with Anna Simon and Jorge Cadaval.

On March 8, 2013, Melody released a merengue version of her song "No sé", which she re-recorded as a duet with Venezuelan reggaeton artist DJ Pana. The music video for the song was shot on location in Venezuela and Miami and premiered on YouTube on October 15.  In late October, the song reached number 1 in Venezuela.

From October 2013 to March 2014, Melody competed in the third season of Tu cara me suena, reaching the final along with Edurne, Xuso Jones, Llum Barrera, and Florentino Fernández; she finished as the vice-champion (runner-up). During the season, Melody impersonated artists Bonnie Tyler, Katy Perry, Ricky Martin, Gloria Gaynor, Cher, Gwen Stefani (No Doubt), Alesha Dixon, and Lady Gaga. In four of the nineteen episodes in which she appeared, Melody was the most-voted-for artist.

2014: Mucho camino por andar 
On June 9, 2014, Melody released her sixth album Mucho camino por andar (A Long Way to Go). Recorded in 2012–2014, it was released on Rumba Records. Melody collaborated with DJ Pana, who appears on the song "Hoy me voy". Other musicians on the album include drummer Waldo Madera, violinist Vasko Vassilev, rapper Gordo Máster, musicians Batio Barnabás and Bori de Alarcón, and songwriter José Antonio Benítez Serrano. The album, which was produced by José Marín and Toni Romero, had a new style and more modern sound that her previous albums, as well as more lyrically mature themes. Most of the songs on the album are ballads.

The album's fourth single "Hoy me voy" was launched on the radio stations Radiolé and CafeOlé on June 3, 2014. On June 23, the song was named Hit of the Week by the web portal Música al Día.

On December 23, 2014, Melody premiered a music video for the album's second single "Mucho camino por andar".

2015: It's Now or Never, Melek 2 
On May 29, 2015, Melody released a ballad titled "In My Mind" as a digital single, It was the main theme of the 2015 Spanish film It's Now or Never, in which Melody also starred, making her acting debut.

In addition to her solo career, Melody has formed a musical duo named Melek 2 with her brother Eleazar (Ele). On June 2, 2015, the duo released its first digital single, titled "Tú lo sabes" (Do You Know?). "Tú lo sabes" peaked at number 24 on the  chart in October 2015.

2018: "Parapapá" 
On June 29, 2018, Melody released a new digital single titled "Parapapá". It was her first release since 2015. The track, produced by Rafa Vergana, was recorded in Miami. The music video for this song was uploaded on YouTube on June 28, and garnered 2.2 million views in its first three weeks.

2019: "Rúmbame" 
On February 15, 2019, Melody released a new digital single titled "Rúmbame". The music video was released on YouTube on February 26.

On January 18, "Mátame", Melody's collaboration with Cuban artists Descemer Bueno and El Micha was premiered on Descerner Bueno's YouTube channel. The music video was directed by Pedro Vázquez and Descemer Bueno and was filmed in March 2017 during Melody's visit to Cuba at locations in Havana including Jardines de La Tropical.

Discography 

 De pata negra (2001)
 Muévete (2002)
 T.Q.M. (2003)
 Melodía (2004)
 Los buenos días (2008)
 Mucho camino por andar (2014)

Awards and nominations 
Latin Grammy Awards

|-
|style="text-align:center;"| 2002
| De pata negra
| Best Children's Album
|
|-

Latin Billboard Music Awards

|-
| style="text-align:center;"| 2003
| De pata negra
| Latin Pop Album of the Year, New Artist
| 
|-

References

External links
 

Living people
People from Dos Hermanas
Singers from Andalusia
Spanish child singers
21st-century Spanish singers
21st-century Spanish women singers
1990 births
Women in Latin music